The Italian guerrilla war in Ethiopia was a conflict fought from the summer of 1941 to the autumn of 1943 by remnants of Italian troops in Ethiopia and Somalia, in a short-lived attempt to re-establish Italian East Africa. The guerrilla campaign was fought following the Italian defeat during the East African Campaign of World War II, while the war was still raging in Northern Africa and Europe.

Background

By the time Haile Selassie, the Emperor of Ethiopia, entered Addis Ababa triumphantly in May 1941, the military defeat of Mussolini's forces in Ethiopia by the combined armies of Ethiopian partisans and Allied troops (mostly from the British Empire) was assured. When General Guglielmo Nasi surrendered with military honors the last troops of the Italian colonial army in East Africa at Gondar in November 1941, many of his personnel decided to start a guerrilla war in the mountains and deserts of Ethiopia, Eritrea and Somalia. Nearly 7,000 Italian soldiers (according to the historian Alberto Rosselli) participated in the guerilla campaign in the hope that the German-Italian army of Rommel would win in Egypt (making the Mediterranean an Italian Mare Nostrum) and recapture the recently liberated territories. A portion of the Imperial War Museum website on the Italian defeat in East Africa notes that 'several thousand [Italian soldiers] escaped to wage a guerrilla war until September 1943, when Italy surrendered to the Allies.'

Prelude

There were originally two main Italian guerrilla organizations: the Fronte di Resistenza (Front of Resistance) and the Figli d'Italia (Sons of Italy). The Fronte di Resistenza was a military organization led by Colonel Lucchetti and centered in the main cities of the former Italian East Africa.  Its main activities were military sabotage and collection of information about Allied troops to be sent to Italy in multiple ways. The Figli d'Italia organization was formed in September 1941 by Blackshirts of the "Milizia Volontaria per la Sicurezza Nazionale" (a fascist organization of volunteer soldiers).  They engaged in a guerrilla war against the Allied troops and harassed Italian civilians and colonial soldiers (askaris) that had been dubbed "traitors" for co-operating with the Allied and Ethiopian forces.

Other groups were the "Tigray" fighters of Lieutenant Amedeo Guillet in Eritrea and the guerrilla group of Major Gobbi based at Dessie.  From the beginning of 1942 there was a guerilla group in Eritrea, under the command of Captain Aloisi, which was dedicated to helping Italians to escape from the British prisoner of war camps of Asmara and Decameré. In the first months of 1942 (because of the August 1940 Italian invasion of British Somaliland), there were also Italian guerrillas in British Somaliland.

While essentially on their own, the guerrillas occasionally received support and encouragement from mainland Italy. On 9 May 1942, the Regia Aeronautica staged a long-range twenty-eight-hour Savoia-Marchetti SM.75 flight over Asmara, dropping propaganda leaflets telling Italian colonists that Rome had not forgotten them and would return. On May 23, 1943, two SM.75s made another long-range flight to attack the American airfield at Gura. One craft encountered fuel difficulties and instead bombed Port Sudan; both aircraft successfully hit their targets and returned to Rhodes, accomplishing a significant propaganda victory.

There were several Eritreans and Somalis (and even a few Ethiopians) who provided aid to the Italian guerrillas. But their numbers dwindled after the Axis defeat at the battle of El Alamein in 1942.

These guerrilla units (called Bande in Italian) were able to operate in a very extended area, from northern Eritrea to southern Somalia. Their armament was made up mainly of old "91" rifles, Beretta pistols, Fiat and Schwarzlose machine-guns, hand grenades, dynamite and even some small 65 mm cannons. But they always lacked large amounts of ammunition.

Guerrilla war

From January 1942, many of these "Bande" started to operate under the coordinated orders of General Muratori (commander of the fascist "Milizia").  He was able to encourage a revolt against the Allied forces by the Azebo Oromo tribe in northern Ethiopia, who had a history of rebellion. The revolt was put down by Allied forces operating alongside the Ethiopian army only at the beginning of 1943.

In spring 1942, even Haile Selassie I (who stated in his autobiography that "the Italians have always been the bane of the Ethiopian people") started to open diplomatic channels of communication with the Italian insurgents, allegedly because he was impressed by the victory of Rommel in Tobruk, Libya. Major Lucchetti declared (after the guerrilla war) that the Emperor, if the Axis had reached Ethiopia, was ready to accept an Italian protectorate with these conditions:
 a total amnesty for all the Ethiopians sentenced by Italy
 the presence of Ethiopians in all levels of the administration
 the participation of Emperor Haile Selassie in the future government of the protectorate.

In the summer of 1942, the most successful units were those led by Colonel Calderari in Somalia, Colonel Di Marco in the Ogaden, Colonel Ruglio amongst the Danakil and "Blackshirt centurion" De Varda in Ethiopia. Their ambushes forced the Allies under William Platt with the British Military Mission to Ethiopia to dispatch troops, with airplanes and tanks, from Kenya and Sudan to the guerrilla-ridden territories of the former Italian East Africa. That summer, the Allied authorities decided to intern the majority of the Italian population of coastal Somalia, in order to avoid them possibly coming into contact with Japanese submarines. In October 1942, the Italian guerrillas started to lose steam because of the Italian-German defeat at the Battle of El Alamein and the capture of Major Lucchetti (the head of the Fronte di Resistenza organization).

The guerrilla war continued until summer 1943, when the remaining Italian soldiers started to destroy their armaments and in some cases, escaped to Italy, like Lieutenant Amedeo Guillet, (nicknamed "the Devil Commander" by the British) who reached Taranto on September 3, 1943.  He requested from the Italian War Ministry an "aircraft loaded with equipment to be used for guerrilla attacks in Eritrea", but the Italian armistice a few days later ended his plan.

One of the last Italian soldiers to surrender to the Allied forces was Corrado Turchetti, who wrote in his memoirs that some soldiers continued to ambush Allied troops until October 1943.  The last Italian officer known to have fought the guerrilla war was Colonel Nino Tramonti in Eritrea.

Noteworthy guerrilla actions 

Of the many Italians who performed guerrilla actions between December 1941 and September 1943, two are worthy of note:
 Francesco De Martini, captain of the Military Information Service (Servizio Informazioni Militari, or SIM) who in January 1942 blew up an ammunition depot in Massaua, Eritrea and later organized a group of Eritrean sailors (with small boats called sambuco) in order to identify, and notify Rome with his radio, of the Royal Navy movements throughout the Red Sea until he was captured at Dahlak Kebir in August 1942. De Martini received the Italian gold medal of honor.
 Rosa Dainelli, a doctor who in August 1942 succeeded in entering the main ammunition depot of the British army in Addis Abeba, and blowing it up, miraculously surviving the huge explosion. Her sabotage destroyed the ammunition for the new British Sten submachine gun, delaying the use of the newly created piece of equipment for many months.  Doctor Dainelli was proposed for the Italian iron medal of honor (croce di ferro). Some sources claim the date of attack was actually 15 September 1941.

See also 

 List of British military equipment of World War II
 List of Second Italo-Ethiopian War weapons of Ethiopia-List of Ethiopian equipment of the time which would have been supplemented by captured Italian weapons. 
 List of Italian Army equipment in World War II

Notes

Bibliography
 Bullotta, Antonia. La Somalia sotto due bandiere Edizioni Garzanti, 1949 
 Cernuschi, Enrico. La resistenza sconosciuta in Africa Orientale Rivista Storica, dicembre 1994.(Rivista Italiana Difesa) 
 Del Boca, Angelo. Gli Italiani in Africa Orientale La caduta dell'Impero Editori Laterza, 1982. 
 Di Lalla, Fabrizio. Le italiane in Africa Orientale. Storie di donne in colonia Solfanelli Editore, Chieti, 2014. (in italian)
 Di Lalla, Fabrizio, Sotto due bandiere. Lotta di liberazione etiopica e resistenza italiana in Africa Orientale, Solfanelli Editore, Chieti, 2016. (in italian)
 Rosselli, Alberto. Storie Segrete. Operazioni sconosciute o dimenticate della seconda guerra mondiale Iuculano Editore. Pavia, 2007 
 Sbacchi, Alberto. Hailé Selassié and the Italians, 1941–43. African Studies Review, vol.XXII, n.1, April 1979. 
 ASMAI/III, Archivio Segreto. Relazione Lucchetti. 2 Guerra Mondiale pacco IV. 
 Segre, Vittorio Dan. La guerra privata del tenente Guillet. Corbaccio Editore. Milano, 1993 

Ethiopia in World War II
Guerrilla wars
Italian East Africa
Military history of Italy during World War II
Military history of British Somaliland during World War II
Eritrea in World War II
Somalia in World War II
East African campaign (World War II)
Wars involving Ethiopia
Wars involving Italy
1940s in Ethiopia
Ethiopia–Italy military relations
World War II resistance movements
Guerrilla organizations